South Pasadena station (formerly Mission station) is an at-grade light rail station on the L Line of the Los Angeles Metro Rail system. It is located at the intersection of Mission Street and Meridian Avenue in South Pasadena, California, after which the station is named. The station opened on July 26, 2003, as part of the original Gold Line, then known as the "Pasadena Metro Blue Line" project. This station and all the other original and Foothill Extension stations will be part of the A Line upon completion of the Regional Connector project in 2023.

This station features the adjacent station art sculpture "Astride-Aside" (2003) by artist Michael Stutz. The station has a 122 space park and ride lot and there is a fee to park.

The original South Pasadena station and freight depot, for the Atchison, Topeka and Santa Fe railroad, was demolished in 1954.

Service

Station layout

Hours and frequency

Connections 
, the following connections are available:
 Los Angeles Metro Bus:

Nearby landmarks
 South Pasadena Public Library (a Carnegie Library)
 Meridian Ironworks Museum
 Mission West Business District
 Farmers Market (Thursdays from 4 pm to 8 pm)

References

 

L Line (Los Angeles Metro) stations
Metro
Public transportation in the San Gabriel Valley
Railway stations in the United States opened in 2003
Former Atchison, Topeka and Santa Fe Railway stations in California
Railway stations in the United States opened in 1911
Railway stations closed in 1954